Concepción Huista is a town and municipality in the Guatemalan department of Huehuetenango.

Climate

Concepción Huista has a subtropical highland climate (Köppen: Cwb).

Geographic location

Concepción Huista is completely surrounded by Huehuetenango Department municipalities:

See also
 
 
 La Aurora International Airport
 Guatemala
 Tapachula International Airport

Notes and references

References

Municipalities of the Huehuetenango Department